The Bacia do Rio Macacu Environmental Protection Area is an environmental protection area in the state of Rio de Janeiro, Brazil.

Location

The Bacia do Rio Macacu Environmental Protection Area (APA) covers parts of the municipalities of Cachoeiras de Macacu, Itaboraí and Guapimirim in Rio de Janeiro.
It includes areas of plains and lowlands and mountainous areas with springs and important remnants of forest.
Its largest area is occupied by pastures, vegetable fields and quarries for sand to be used in construction.

The Guapimirim-Macacu sub-basin is part of the Guanabara Bay basin.
It is bounded to the north and northwest by the Serra dos Órgãos, to the northeast by the Serra de Macaé de Cima, to the east by the Serra da Botija and the Serra de Monte Azul, and to the south by the Serra do Sambê and the Serra dos Garcias. 

Most of these were created to protect springs and headwaters in the forested mountains as well as biodiversity.

History

The Bacia do Rio Macacu Environmental Protection Area was created by state law 4.018 of 5 December 2002.
Its objective is to protect marginal areas in the basin of the Macacu River, the largest contributor to Guanabara Bay.
It is included in the Central Rio de Janeiro Atlantic Forest Mosaic, created in December 2006.
The management plan was prepared in 2009 by the Brazilian Agricultural Research Corporation (Embrapa) in cooperation with other institutions, within a regional planning strategy for the mosaic which considered opportunities for forming corridors between the protected areas and for ecologically sound agriculture.

Notes

Sources

Further reading

2002 establishments in Brazil
Environmental protection areas of Brazil
Protected areas of Rio de Janeiro (state)